I Not Stupid is a 2002 Singaporean comedy film about the lives, struggles, and adventures of three Primary 6 pupils who are placed in the academically inferior EM3 stream. Written and directed by Jack Neo, and produced by Mediacorp Raintree Pictures, the film stars Huang Po Ju, Shawn Lee, Joshua Ang, Xiang Yun, Jack Neo, Richard Low and Selena Tan.

Released in cinemas on 9 February 2002, I Not Stupid earned over S$3.8 million, becoming the second-highest grossing Singaporean film. Its satirical criticism of the Singaporean education system and social attitudes in Singapore sparked public discussions and parliamentary debates that led to reforms in the education system. Its sequel, I Not Stupid Too, was released in 2006.

Plot
The film's storyline revolves around the lives and families of three students in the EM3 academic stream, Terry Khoo (Huang Po Ju), Liu Kok Pin (刘国彬 Liú Guóbīn; Shawn Lee) and Ang Boon Hock (洪文福 Hóng Wénfú; Joshua Ang). Terry, pampered and from a rich family, is a meek and obedient boy, with a domineering mother Mrs. Khoo (Selena Tan) and a negligent businessman father Jerry Khoo (Richard Low).  Kok Pin is pushed to excel at school by his mother (Xiang Yun), but he shows a talent for art, not academics – much to the consternation of his mother. Boon Hock and his mother (Wong Choi Yeng) struggle to make ends meet by running a small wonton noodle stall, to make up for the lack of a father figure, he places high value on loyalty and "manliness" in his friends.

The boys are often bullied for being in the "stupid" stream, which eventually leads to a fight during which one of the bullies who happened to be Boon Hock's cousin named Ang Tiong Meng (Jed Tay) from the EM1 stream, is accidentally injured after having a scuffle with Kok Pin and his face was hit by the fence. This is because Tiong Meng was the one who bullied the boys and provoking them by looking down on them on their poor Mathematics test results. In the discipline mistress's Ms Tan's (Patricia Mok) office, Kok Pin and Boon Hock explain what happened, where Tiong Meng and his mother (Lim Kwee Hiok) were also present, but Terry declines to testify on their behalf, following his mother's instructions to "mind his own business", which infuriates his friends and causes trouble between the boys.

Meanwhile, Jerry gets in a fight with a man who turns out to be Kok Pin's father, Mr. Liu (Jack Neo), a chinese copywriter, over a parking space outside their childeren's primary school, as the both of them are about to fetch them after they finished lessons in school 1 day.  Mr. Khoo's company is a client for Mr. Liu's firm, an advertising agency. Their new-found enmity causes Mr. Khoo to select the marketing campaign of John (Harlow Russell), an American expatriate and creative director of Mr Liu's firm, over that of Mr. Liu and Ben's (Hossan Leong) proposal, the latter being the creative group head, as they're both partners working together in the firm who dislikes John for many reasons, in addition to the stereotype that Americans are better than Asians. As John's ideas are deemed culturally inappropriate by locals, even going to the extent of stealing Mr Liu and Ben's ideas from their proposal, Mr. Khoo's business suffers due to the loss of customers.

As the boys deal with their problems, a new form teacher who coincidentally happens to be their Mathematics teacher at school named Ms. Lee Su Zhen (Kelly Wen Su Ru) helps by inspiring Boon Hock to excel in Mathematics, while reaching out to the other boys. Kok Pin continues to struggle, and enlists Boon Hock to help him cheat in the Preliminary examinations, but they are caught. Unable to face his mother, Kok Pin attempts suicide, and he would have died if it was not for a group of teenagers running from some police officers, where one of the teenagers happened to be Terry's elder sister named Selena Khoo (Cheryl Chan). When he finally tells his mother, she tries to punish him but collapses; a doctor later diagnoses her with leukemia, and tells Kok Pin that she will die without a bone marrow transplant.

As the end of the year approaches, Boon Hock excels in the PSLE Mathematics exam, while the other boys manage to scrape by – Kok Pin only marginally. Contrary to Kok Pin's fears, his mother is satisfied because he has tried his best. When visiting Mrs. Liu at the hospital, Ms. Lee announces that one of Kok Pin's drawings won second prize in an American International Youth Drawing Competition, but the moment is overshadowed by the rush to save Mrs. Liu's life. Mr. Khoo passes the transplant test, but refuses to donate after discovering the intended recipient is his enemy's wife. He eventually relents, but it is revealed that due to a mix-up Terry, not Mr. Khoo, is the suitable donor. Despite protests from his parents, he insists on undergoing the operation, which is a success. A grateful Mr. Liu offers to help Mr. Khoo's business with his proposal. As a result, Mr. Khoo's business booms, and the two enemies become good friends. The film ends with Terry being bullied once again, as in the beginning of the film – but this time, he stands up for himself and fights back.

Political satire
I Not Stupid criticises many aspects of modern Singaporean culture, including streaming in the education system, deference to authority, and sociocultural stereotypes.  The film can be read as an allegory for Singaporean society – the pampered protagonist and narrator, Terry, is an "everyman"; deferent and coddled, with a domineering mother and affluent father. Terry's intellectual failings lead him to be placed in the inferior EM3 stream, which becomes the driving force behind the storyline. The subsequent stigma placed upon the narrator illustrates how the Singaporean education system promotes academic elitism, with students in lower streams looked down upon as inferior, making it harder for them to catch up and realise their potential (see golem effect), even if they are not necessarily stupid. This kiasu mentality puts mounting pressure upon the protagonists of the film, confounding them as they attempt to improve their standing and ameliorate their reputation in a society which judges them "worthless".

Terry's mother, Mrs. Khoo, is a "thinly veiled stand-in for the Singapore government", whose "mother-knows-best" mentality is well-meaning, but strips her children of their freedom. She demands total obedience, and her repeated lines "Do you know how lucky you are to have a good and responsible mother?" and "This is all for your own good" parody the Singapore government's efforts to convince Singaporeans that government policies and actions is in the best interests of the nation. Mrs. Khoo also uses her position of power to buy off rebellion in her charges with gifts and bribes, in a pointed criticism of the government's social policies. Other characters in the film comment on this relationship – for instance, in one scene, Mr. Liu states that "it is difficult to catch fish in Singapore, because fish in Singapore are like Singaporeans; they'll never open their mouths", poking fun at the Singaporean trait of obedience and respect for authority.

The film also touches on other issues including Chinese self-loathing (wherein Singaporean companies regard Western expatriates as inherently superior to local workers), suicide, the use of Singlish, and the differences between English and Chinese.

Production
Jack Neo's inspiration for the film was the Iranian movie Children of Heaven. Neo and his wife were moved to "holding hands and crying after seeing the love shared by the children", which motivated him to make his own movie about youth. After speaking with parents to find topics to discuss in his film, Neo learned that due to problems with the Singaporean education system, specifically streaming, students face considerable academic and emotional stress. This problem formed the core of his film, which he called I Not Stupid in reference to the social stigma that streaming places on students.

Neo also drew on a dissatisfaction he felt with the way the school system promoted deference to authority over self-reliance; he wanted his film to tell youth "If you don't want to change or make a difference, you won't. It's all up to you". In exploring these ideas, Neo spent over two years researching and editing the script — checking scenes for accuracy, verifying facts, and drafting dialogue. Altogether, the work went through thirteen different revisions, and saw over 50 children audition for the lead roles, before Neo decided to send I Not Stupid into production.

This production was carried out by Raintree Pictures on a budget of S$900,000, sponsored by Bee Cheng Hiang, Yeo Hiap Seng and Sunshine Bakeries. The production crew included Daniel Yun as executive producer, David Leong and Chan Pui Yin as producers, Ardy Lam as cinematographer and Li Yi as music supervisor. In addition to writing and directing, Neo also composed the theme song, which was sung by Chen Guorong. The actual filming took place at Braddell Westlake Secondary School and Westlake Primary School over a period of 24 days, and the film found distribution through Raintree Pictures and United International Pictures.

Reception
I Not Stupid earned just S$46,000 during a limited sneak preview run, prompting Raintree Pictures to embark on a massive publicity campaign, including invitations for teachers to discuss the film. After showing for four months on 30 screens the film earned S$3.8 million, becoming the second-highest grossing Singaporean film after Money No Enough. Following its success in Singapore, I Not Stupid was released in Malaysia, Hong Kong, Taiwan and mainland China. The film also screened at the Pusan International Film Festival, Tokyo International Film Festival, the Jakarta International Film Festival and the 2005 Singapore Season cultural exhibition in London. Over 50,000 VCDs of I Not Stupid were sold and its sole distributor, VideoVan, declared it the "No. 1 selling VCD in Singapore". This claim was disputed by Alliance Entertainment, which said that 70,000 VCDs of Money No Enough were sold, but VideoVan called the comparison inaccurate, as Money No Enough was a mature title, rather than a new release.

Awards that I Not Stupid won include Best Chinese Film at the Golden Bauhinia Awards and Best Chinese Humanitarian Film at the 2002 Taiwan Golden Torch Awards; the film was also nominated for Best Asian Film at the Hong Kong Film Awards, losing to My Sassy Girl. Critics praised the film for its humour and uniqueness, noting that it touched a raw nerve among Singaporeans. For example, Sanjuro of LoveHKFilm.com wrote, "I Not Stupid covers a variety of serious subjects, but all the while maintains a light comedic touch. Jack Neo [makes this film] a clever, well-crafted social commentary and a damn good film to boot". Other reviewers described I Not Stupid as "one of the greatest cinematic feats I've had the pleasure of experiencing" and displaying a "simple and yet excellent execution". In contrast, FilmAsia reviewer Soh Yun-Huei, found it "most shocking...that the Singapore censors actually allowed this film through in the first place".

Despite its political satire, the film received a positive response from the government of Singapore. Goh Chok Tong, the second Prime Minister of Singapore, commended Jack Neo's creative talent during his National Day Rally speech on 18 August 2002. In 2004, Neo was the first local film-maker to receive a National Day Award, and on 21 October 2005, he and Dick Lee became the first pop culture artists to receive the Cultural Medallion, Singapore's highest arts award. The movie sparked public discussion and parliamentary debate about the negative effects of streaming. In 2004, the Ministry of Education decided to merge the EM1 and EM2 streams, and the EM3 stream was scrapped in 2008.

References

External links

 I Not Stupid official website
 I Not Stupid IMDB Page

2002 comedy-drama films
2002 films
Films directed by Jack Neo
Hokkien-language films
2000s Mandarin-language films
Singaporean comedy-drama films
2000s English-language films